Vavval Pasanga is a 2012 Indian Tamil-language romantic drama film directed by Suresh. The film stars Rahul and Utthara Unni in the lead roles.

Plot synopsis 
A youngster is compelled to choose an unfavorable path because of societal pressure and turns into a cold-blooded gangster, his life starts to change when he falls in love.

Cast 
Rahul as  Kasi a.k.a. Vavval 
Utthara Unni
Raja as Kasi's father

Production 
This film marks the film debut of Utthara Unni, daughter of Malayalam actress Urmila Unni.

Soundtrack 
The music is composed by Jerome Pushparaj, who previously composed for Thodakkam (2008). The film's music was praised by Kamal Haasan.

Reception 
A critic from The Times of India rated the film 2 out of 5 and said that "Vavwal Pasanga has emotions, romance, comedy and action but the problem is that there is no common thread connecting them". Malini Mannath of The New Indian Express called the screenplay "insipid" and "meandering".

References

External links
 

2012 films
Indian romantic drama films
2012 romantic drama films
2010s Tamil-language films